Randall Philip Hennis (born December 16, 1965) is a former Major League Baseball pitcher.

Hennis attended UCLA, and in 1986 he played collegiate summer baseball with the Harwich Mariners of the Cape Cod Baseball League. He was selected by the Astros in the 2nd round of the 1987 MLB Draft.

References

External links

1965 births
Living people
Houston Astros players
Columbus Mudcats players
Tucson Toros players
Osceola Astros players
Brevard County Manatees players
Harwich Mariners players
Major League Baseball pitchers
Baseball players from California
People from Lake County, California